Megabus, branded as megabus.com, is an intercity bus service of Coach USA/Coach Canada operating in the eastern, southern and midwestern United States and in the Canadian provinces of Ontario and Quebec. It is the North American service equivalent to the European Megabus.

Some tickets, if purchased well in advance, are priced as low as $1, with occasional free promotions, in addition to an online booking fee of $2.50 per transaction. Megabus follows the yield management model, typically used by airlines, where the lowest fares are offered to those who book early. Only one or two seats are sold for $0 or $1 per schedule, so the less popular schedules tend to be less expensive. Bus stops may be in public streets, bus stations, outside railroad stations or transportation centers in major cities, or on college campuses or at shopping centers in other cities.

Upon purchase of a ticket, passengers are given a reservation number to be shown to the bus operator upon boarding. In the United States, tickets are not available from the bus operator. In Canada, owing to franchise regulations, tickets are sold at stops but may be more expensive than those purchased online.

Reservations can be changed for a fee of $3-$7.50.

History
On April 10, 2006, Stagecoach Group, operator of Megabus (Europe), introduced the Megabus brand in the United States through its Coach USA subsidiary with daily routes between Chicago and Milwaukee, Indianapolis, Cincinnati, Cleveland, St Louis, Ann Arbor, Columbus, Louisville, Toledo, Detroit, Kansas City, Minneapolis and State College.

On August 8, 2007, Megabus introduced service to the San Francisco Bay Area, Los Angeles, San Diego and Tempe, Arizona, using Coach America as a contractor. In its first foray into California, ridership was sluggish and Megabus started to discontinue services from Los Angeles in early 2008. Service to the Phoenix area was discontinued in January 2008, followed by services in San Diego and San Ysidro in March 2008. In May 2008, Megabus made the decision to shut down service to/from Los Angeles and discontinue all related services. The final day for services from Los Angeles was June 22, 2008. Megabus re-entered the market in 2012 after reacquiring some of the assets of Coach America, which had been part of Coach USA prior to a major divestiture in 2003.

In late May 2008, Megabus began service to/from New York City, with service to/from Albany, Atlantic City, Baltimore, Boston, Buffalo, Philadelphia, Toronto and Washington, D.C. Further expansions included service to Syracuse, Rochester, Hartford and Niagara Falls, Ontario. Niagara Falls and Hartford were later withdrawn although service to Hartford resumed in 2010.

Megabus returned to the West Coast on December 12, 2012 initially serving San Francisco, Oakland, San Jose, Sacramento, Reno, Riverside and Los Angeles. On its west coast routes, Megabus operates almost exclusively from either commuter rail stations or transfer stations for local transit buses.

In April 2019, Stagecoach Group sold its North American operations, including Megabus, to Variant Equity Advisors.

Destinations history

Atlanta
Megabus announced service to in Atlanta, its first destination in the Southeastern United States, on October 25, 2011. On November 16, 2011, Megabus began operations out of Atlanta from the Civic Center station in Downtown Atlanta.

Initially, Megabus offered service from Atlanta to Chattanooga, Nashville, Knoxville, Montgomery, Jacksonville, Gainesville, Orlando, Memphis, Birmingham, Charlotte, Durham, Mobile, Richmond and Washington, D.C. Megabus now also serves Athens and New Orleans. In addition, passengers are able to link to northeastern US Megabus service through Knoxville and Charlotte, and link to Midwestern Megabus services through Memphis and Nashville.

Megabus also has a bus line linking Memphis, Nashville and Knoxville, started on March 14, 2012.

Service between Atlanta and Athens, Georgia, Columbia, South Carolina, Fayetteville, North Carolina and Durham, North Carolina began February 18, 2014.

Baton Rouge
Baton Rouge service was added September 9, 2013, with service to New Orleans and San Antonio.

Chicago
Megabus began operations in the U.S. on April 10, 2006, with routes between Chicago and Cincinnati, Cleveland, Columbus, Detroit, Indianapolis, Milwaukee, Minneapolis and St Louis, from a stop on the curb next to Chicago Union Station. Megabus passengers are prohibited from waiting in the station unless they are using other companies' services. Services also began between Indianapolis and Cincinnati. A service that was initially offered between Indianapolis and Columbus was later withdrawn due to low ridership.

On September 11, 2006, a stop in Toledo was added on the route operating between Chicago and Cleveland. Additional services were added on April 2, 2007: a stop in Ann Arbor along the Chicago-Detroit route for travel to and from Chicago, new service between Minneapolis and Milwaukee, an extension of the Chicago-Toledo-Cleveland route into Pittsburgh (since withdrawn on the Midwest network, but later re-entered on the Northeast network), an extension of the Chicago-St. Louis route into Kansas City, reactivation of the Chicago-Indianapolis-Columbus route, new service between Cincinnati and Columbus, and new service between Chicago and Louisville via Indianapolis (since withdrawn).

On March 13, 2008, a stop was added in Madison, Wisconsin, on the twice daily Chicago-Minneapolis route.

Columbia, Missouri was added with one stop daily in each direction on the Chicago-St. Louis-Kansas City route; it was discontinued in September 2015.

On March 27, 2008, a new route was added, Chicago-Champaign-Memphis, offering 2 daily trips in each direction. In early 2010, Champaign/Memphis route was cut to one daily round-trip due to poor ridership, but the second round trip has since been restored.

On May 4, 2010, a route from Chicago to Des Moines via Iowa City began operating. On August 17, 2011, Megabus started service to Omaha, via Des Moines and Iowa City; twice-daily departures and arrivals from Omaha and an increase to four daily departures and arrivals from Des Moines and Iowa City.

On March 14, 2012, Megabus started service from Chicago to Nashville via Indianapolis and Louisville. Service was later extended to Atlanta via Chattanooga. In June 2012, Megabus announced service from Chicago to Detroit via Grand Rapids and East Lansing beginning July 12.

On February 2, 2015, Megabus discontinued service from Columbus, Ohio to Cleveland.

On March 1, 2017, Megabus added service between Chicago and Lincoln, NE thru Moline, Coralville, Des Moines and Omaha.

Dallas
On May 31, 2012, Megabus announced new service to be effective June 19, 2012 to/from Grand Prairie, near the Dallas-Fort Worth metroplex. From Dallas, passengers had options to travel to Houston, Austin, San Antonio, Little Rock, Memphis, Norman, Oklahoma City, Springfield and St Louis. Passengers also have the option to connect to other Megabus routes in Memphis, from Dallas; and to New Orleans, from Houston. On November 18, 2012, it was announced that customers would also be able to be served in Dallas downtown area as well as the Grand Prairie location. Megabus received the necessary permissions to start on the following Monday.

On April 4, 2013, service was discontinued for the Oklahoma state and Missouri state stops via Dallas. Dallas-to-St. Louis is now only accessible via routing through Memphis.

Los Angeles
Service was extended to Anaheim on December 6, 2014.  They have since discontinued it.

New Orleans
Service between New Orleans and Jackson, Mississippi, Oxford, Mississippi and Memphis, Tennessee began December 17, 2013.

New York

On May 30, 2008, Megabus began East Coast operations with service to and from Atlantic City (operated by Academy Bus), Washington, D.C., Boston, Philadelphia, Buffalo and Toronto. Service to Baltimore was added after negotiations over the usage of the White Marsh Park & Ride were concluded. On June 6, a once-daily service was added to Binghamton for travel to and from Buffalo and Toronto. The company claims to service Baltimore, though the stop is actually well outside of Baltimore city limits.

As of November 2008, the company was running 14 daily New York City-Washington, DC trips.

In December 2008, service to Binghamton, which had been operating only to Buffalo and Toronto, was dropped in favor of service to Syracuse, Rochester and Niagara Falls. A new route also began service to and from Albany. Both revised services offer four trips daily (up from two on the Toronto line), with a fifth Buffalo-Toronto express overnight trip also offered. All services were moved from the Royal York Hotel to the Toronto Coach terminal. Hartford was also added on the M22 route in December 2008, with service to Boston or New York available.

Service to/from Hartford was added December 4, 2008, but withdrawn on September 14, 2009.

Eastern Bus and Today's Bus were acquired by Coach USA in late 2008 and early 2009 but were divested in 2009.

On May 4, 2010, service between New York and Pittsburgh via State College began operating; Pittsburgh had previously been served by a route to and from Chicago earlier. In July 2010, Philadelphia and Boston were added as destinations. In August 2010, Providence to New York was added as a route.

On September 8, 2010, service was stopped between Philadelphia and Atlantic City due to low ridership. On December 15, 2010, service was added to Hartford and Amherst. Service between New York and Amherst began on December 15, 2010; extended to Burlington and Montpelier in 2014. A Brattleboro stop was added in September 2016.

Beginning August 1, 2012, the New York stop moved to 34th Street between 11th and 12th Avenues, across the street from the Javits Center and the 34th Street - Hudson Yards subway station.

In July 2018, Megabus restarted service between Cleveland and New York City. The service was again halted due to the COVID-19 pandemic and has not resumed.

Toronto
In June 2008, Coach Canada began offering tickets from C$1 on its route between Toronto and Montreal, using the same yield management model. The route was later rebranded to a Megabus route.

In March 2023 Megabus announced a Toronto-Detroit route will begin operations in April. There will be four stops enroute between the two cities.

Ottawa
On May 14, 2021, Megabus said that they would start routes between Toronto, Scarborough, Kingston and Ottawa. This was in response to Greyhound Canada's announcement that they would shut down all their operations in Canada.

Pittsburgh
On March 29, 2011, Megabus announced service to/from Pittsburgh, operating service out of the David L. Lawrence Convention Center underpass. Megabus routes from Pittsburgh included Pittsburgh-State College-NYC, Pittsburgh-Washington, Pittsburgh-Harrisburg-Philadelphia-Camden, Pittsburgh-Erie-Buffalo-Toronto, Pittsburgh-Columbus-Cincinnati, Pittsburgh-Akron-Cleveland (a restoration of an earlier cut), and Pittsburgh-Toledo-Detroit.

Megabus also announced a route between Pittsburgh and Ann Arbor, starting March 14, 2012.

On March 13, 2012, Megabus removed under-performing services from Pittsburgh, including Pittsburgh-Erie-Buffalo-Toronto and Pittsburgh-Columbus-Cincinnati and Pittsburgh-Akron, leaving Pittsburgh-State College-NYC, Pittsburgh-Washington, Pittsburgh-Harrisburg-Philadelphia, and Pittsburgh-Cleveland-Toledo-Detroit-Ann Arbor as the remaining services. On May 6, 2014, Megabus also ended the Pittsburgh-Ann Arbor route due to poor ridership, leaving Pittsburgh customers with no direct connection to points west of the city.

Philadelphia
Starting July 21, 2010, Megabus began operating service to/from 30th Street Station in Philadelphia. Service operates to the Pennsylvania cities of Harrisburg, State College and Pittsburgh, as well as to Baltimore, Boston, Buffalo, New York City, Toronto and Washington, D.C.

In 2013, Megabus added service to and from Newark, Delaware from Philadelphia en route to Washington, D.C.

Washington D.C.
Megabus began operating to/from Washington, D.C., on December 15, 2010. Included was service to/from Toronto. In November 2011, Megabus began operating from the bus deck in Union Station. Service between Washington and Christiansburg, VirginiaKnoxville and Atlanta also started on December 15, 2010.

In May 2011, Megabus added service to Frederick, Maryland.

Service to/from Morgantown, West Virginia was added on January 12, 2012.

In April 2017, the company began service between Washington D.C. and Virginia Beach.

In October 2018, Megabus added express service between Washington D.C. and Charlottesville, Virginia.

California/Nevada network
Megabus re-entered California on December 12, 2012, serving San Francisco, Oakland, San Jose Sacramento, Reno, Riverside and Los Angeles. Service runs on four routes (LA-San Jose-SF, LA-Oakland-SF, SF-Sacramento and LA-Riverside-Las Vegas).

In California and Nevada, Megabus operates almost exclusively from either commuter rail stations or transfer stations for local transit buses. In Los Angeles, the buses utilize Union Station's Patsaouras Transit Plaza. In San Jose, Megabus stops at Diridon Station. In the Las Vegas Valley, buses utilize RTC's South Strip Transfer Terminal.

A stop in Burbank was added on August 15, 2013, and the route was extended down to Anaheim (serving Orange County) on December 6, 2014.  California service has since been discontinued.

Destinations served

United States

Midwest/Southeast

Fleet
The Megabus fleet has the megabus.com name on the front and sides in yellow against a blue base, and the Megabus logo on the left side of the coach (facing forward) and rear of the bus. The DATTCO fleet used for Megabus service also has Megabus logos, but with a DATTCO logo instead of a Coach USA logo for Megabus buses owned and operated by DATTCO. Buses on the M25 Megabus route operate with Academy Bus livery.

Megabus service began with used Motor Coach Industries 102EL3 Renaissance coaches, often transferred from other Coach USA operations, with some services utilizing Chicago- and Wisconsin Coach Lines buses. In 2007, Coach USA updated its Chicago-based Megabus fleet with new MCI J4500 single-deck and Van Hool TD925 double-deck motorcoaches.

In May 2008, Megabus expanded to the Northeastern United States with a fleet of mostly brand-new Motor Coach Industries D4505 coaches, several new Van Hool TD925-double decker buses, and some buses purchased secondhand or transferred from the Chicago fleet. This expansion came as Megabus exited from the West Coast market. Further expansion in the Northeast came in the fall and winter of 2008-2009, when additional double-decker buses were delivered, resulting in much of the single-deck buses being transferred to sister operation Eastern Shuttle, pushing many of the EL3s to retirement. The fleet transferred to Eastern Shuttle was eventually returned to mainline Coach USA duty following divestiture a few months later.

All Megabus coaches in the United States are equipped with Wi-Fi and electrical outlets.

In accordance with ADA regulations, wheelchair-accessible service is available on all lines (although most service is operated with true-low-floor double-deck coaches). This can now be done online or by phone.

The Canadian Megabus fleet consists of 15 2009 TD925 buses and are operated by Trentway-Wagar. All of the Canada fleet is equipped with electrical outlets and Wi-Fi. The Canadian buses are pooled with the US fleet for NYC-Toronto or Philadelphia-Toronto runs, with drivers swapping at Buffalo to stay within their certified country. On these runs the buses will typically only have Wi-Fi service available in the home country for the bus being used; i.e. Canadian buses will turn off their WiFi at the US border and American buses will turn off WiFi upon entering Canada. This is to avoid incurring roaming charges from the cellular carriers that provide the internet service.

Notable incidents
Megabus vehicles have been involved in a number of crashes. This list does not include Megabus vehicles operated by DATTCO or Concord Coach Lines on services to and from Boston, and services on the M25, which are operated separately).
 On September 1, 2008, a Detroit-bound M1 coach was pulled over by Michigan State police after officers noticed the bus swaying and speeding outside Benton Township, Michigan. The bus's driver was arrested when he was found to have a blood alcohol level of .07, well above the .04 limit for commercial bus operators. It was the first drunk driving incident in Coach USA history. A replacement driver was brought in to bring the 30 passengers to their final destination.
 On September 11, 2010, around 2:30 a.m., a Toronto-bound M34 double-decker coach missed an exit to the William F. Walsh Regional Transportation Center in Syracuse, NY, and hit a railway overpass carrying the St. Lawrence Subdivision along NY Route 370  farther away. Four passengers were killed, all in the front of the upper deck, which was crushed into the lower deck in the crash, and 17 others were injured. Megabus settled the resulting lawsuits, including one for $3.1 million.
 On August 2, 2012, a St. Louis-bound M5 service Megabus coach with 64 passengers slammed into a concrete bridge pillar on Interstate 55 near Litchfield, Illinois. At least one passenger was killed and 30 were hurt. Police attributed the crash to a blown tire.
 On February 21, 2016, a double-decker Megabus traveling from Chicago to Milwaukee turned around an hour into its trip citing a need to "change buses" to its passengers. Shortly after turning around, the bus stopped on the side of U.S. Route 41 in Lake Forest with a flat tire and caught fire before exploding. All passengers, including the driver, had evacuated the bus prior to the explosion and were unharmed, but all passenger belongings still stowed on the bus were destroyed. The incident was liveblogged by then-The New York Times columnist Lucas Peterson. 
On May 22, 2022, a Megabus carrying 47 passengers, traveling from New York City to Washington, DC rolled over on its right side on Interstate 95 northeast of Baltimore, injuring 27 people, 15 of whom went to the hospital.
On August 9, 2022, a Megabus from New York City to Philadelphia hit a pickup truck on the New Jersey Turnpike (Interstate 95) and lost control, causing the double-decker bus to crash into barriers and roll over on its right side at the ramp for the Thomas Edison Service Area. The crash killed two passengers, and seriously injured two others and the bus driver.

The safety of curbside bus services came under scrutiny in 2011 after the World Wide Tours bus crash caused 14 fatalities. The National Transportation Safety Board conducted a six-month study and found that while bus travel was considerably safer than by car, curbside buses had seven times the fatality rates of traditional bus lines.

References

External links

 
 

Intercity bus companies of Canada
Intercity bus companies of the United States
Stagecoach Group bus operators in the United States and Canada
Transportation companies based in New Jersey
Transport companies established in 2006
2006 establishments in New Jersey
2006 establishments in Ontario